Andrea Syngrou Avenue is a major road in Athens, linking the city centre with Poseidonos Avenue near the Bay of Faliro. It was planned and built by, and later named for, Andreas Syngros. It runs southwest to northeast.  The Syngrou–Fix station of the Athens Metro's Red Line is situated near the northeastern end of the avenue. The avenue passes through the municipalities of Palaio Faliro, Kallithea, and Nea Smyrni, as well as Municipality of Athens. The avenue is home to many hotels and functions as one of Athens' various central business districts, due to being home to many company headquarters.

External links
 

Streets in Athens
Nea Smyrni